Lleyton Hewitt defeated Tim Henman in the final, 6–1, 6–2 to win the men's singles tennis title at the 2002 Indian Wells Masters.

Andre Agassi was the defending champion, but lost in the first round to Michel Kratochvil.

Seeds

  Lleyton Hewitt (champion)
  Yevgeny Kafelnikov (quarterfinals)
  Juan Carlos Ferrero (first round)
  Andre Agassi (first round)
  Tommy Haas (second round)
  Sébastien Grosjean (first round)
  Marat Safin (third round)
  Thomas Johansson (first round)
  Tim Henman (final)
  Pete Sampras (semifinals)
  Andy Roddick (withdrew due to an upper respiratory infection)
  Roger Federer (third round)
  Jiří Novák (second round)
  Goran Ivanišević (withdrew due to a left shoulder injury)
  Guillermo Cañas (first round)
  Àlex Corretja (second round)
  Nicolás Lapentti (first round)

Draw

Finals

Top half

Section 1

Section 2

Bottom half

Section 3

Section 4

References
 2002 Pacific Life Open Draw

2002 Pacific Life Open
Singles